Juvatn or Gjuvvatnet is a lake in the municipality of Åseral in Agder county, Norway. The  lake lies on the river Logna in the upper part of the Mandalen valley. The Bortelid ski area lies just west of the lake. There is a dam on the southern part of the lake to use the water as part of a hydro-electric power system in the region. The dam was built in 1958 as part of the Logna power system. The water ultimately flows into the river Mandalselva.

See also
List of lakes in Norway

References

Åseral
Lakes of Agder